Railway stations in Turkmenistan include:

Maps 
 UN Map
 UNHCR Map

Municipalities served by rail

Trans-Caspian Railway 
 Turkmenbashy
 Balkanabat
 Bereket
 Serdar
 Bamy
 Baherden
 Büzmeýin
 Ashgabat - national capital - junction
 Artyk (border crossing into Iran)
 Dushak
 Tejen
 Parahat - junction
 Mary - junction
 Baýramaly
 Türkmenabat - junction
 Farap
 (border crossing into Uzbekistan)

Tejen-Sarahs branch line 
 Parahat - junction
 Sarahs, Turkmenistan
 (border crossing into Iran)
 Sarakhs, Iran - break-of-gauge, bogies exchange.

Mary-Serhetabat branch line 
 Mary - junction
 Ýolöten
 Ymambaba
 Sandykgaçy
 Galaýmor
 Serhetabat 
 (border crossing into Afghanistan)
 Torghundi, Afghanistan

Türkmenabat-Kerki branch line 
 Türkmenabat - junction
 Saýat
 Garabekewül
 Pelwert
 Halaç
 Kerki - junction

 Samarqand 
 border - Uzbekistan
 Amu Dar'ya
 Kerki - junction
 Köýtendag
 Kelif
 border - Uzbekistan

 Kerki - junction
 Ymamnazar
 (border crossing into Afghanistan)
 Aqina
 Andkhoy

Türkmenabat-Daşoguz Line (former Çärjew-Moscow line)
 Türkmenabat - junction
 Darganata
 Gazojak
 (short border crossing into Uzbekistan)
 Daşoguz
 Boldumsaz
 (border crossing into Uzbekistan)

Trans-Karakum Railway
 Ashgabat - junction
 Ovadandepe
 Içoguz
 Daşoguz

North-South Transnational Corridor
 Bolashak, Kazakhstan
 (border crossing from Kazakhstan)
 Serhetýak
 Bereket - junction
 Döwletýar
 Bugdaýly
 Etrek
 Akýaýla
 (border crossing into Iran) - break-of-gauge, bogies exchange.

See also 
 International North–South Transport Corridor
 Rail transport in Turkmenistan
 Trans-Caspian railway
 Trans-Karakum Railway
 Transport in Turkmenistan
 Türkmendemirýollary

References

External links
List of railroad stations in Turkmenistan

Turkmenistan
Railway stations
Railway stations